Nyssodrysternum impensum is a species of beetle in the family Cerambycidae. It was described by Monne in 1985.

References

Nyssodrysternum
Beetles described in 1985